Eduardo Gabriel dos Santos Bauermann (born 13 February 1996), known as Eduardo Bauermann, is a Brazilian footballer who plays as a defender for Santos.

Club career

Internacional
Born in Estância Velha, Rio Grande do Sul, Bauermann joined Internacional's youth setup in June 2006, aged ten. He made his first team debut at the age of just 17 on 26 January 2014, starting in a 2–1 Campeonato Gaúcho away win over Passo Fundo, as his side used an under-23 squad.

Bauermann made his Série A debut with Inter on 17 May 2015, coming on as a second-half substitute for Léo Morais in a 1–0 home success over Avaí. Roughly one year later, after being rarely used, he was loaned to Série B side Náutico.

Bauermann immediately became a starter at the Timbu, scoring his first senior goal on 22 July 2016 in a 3–1 defeat of Avaí. On 3 August, however, he was recalled by his parent club, and featured in five league matches as the club suffered their first-ever top tier relegation.

On 3 May 2017, after being again rarely used, Bauermann moved to Atlético Goianiense on loan until December. On 18 December, he moved to Figueirense also in a temporary deal.

Paraná
On 4 January 2019, Bauermann signed a one-year contract with Paraná, after the club agreed to a "partnership" with Internacional. A backup option to Rodolfo Filemon and Fernando Timbó during the Campeonato Paranaense, he subsequently became a starter during the Série B as his side missed out promotion after finishing sixth.

América Mineiro
On 4 January 2020, Bauermann agreed to a two-year deal with América Mineiro also in the second division. He featured sparingly in his first season, as his side achieved promotion to the top tier.

Bauermann became a regular starter in his second campaign, featuring in 35 league matches as his side qualified to the Copa Libertadores for the first time ever.

Santos

In November 2021, Bauermann agreed to a pre-contract with Santos, effective as of the following year. On 3 January of the following year, his three-year deal was confirmed by the club.

Bauermann made his debut for Peixe on 26 January 2022, starting in a 0–0 Campeonato Paulista away draw against Inter de Limeira. He scored his first goal for the club on 6 February, netting the opener in a 1–1 draw at Guarani.

Career statistics

References

External links

1996 births
Living people
Sportspeople from Rio Grande do Sul
Brazilian footballers
Association football defenders
Campeonato Brasileiro Série A players
Campeonato Brasileiro Série B players
Sport Club Internacional players
Clube Náutico Capibaribe players
Atlético Clube Goianiense players
Figueirense FC players
Paraná Clube players
América Futebol Clube (MG) players
Santos FC players
Brazil youth international footballers
Brazil under-20 international footballers